Christopher Mark Nineham (born June 1962) is a British political activist and founder member of the Stop the War Coalition serving as National Officer and Deputy Chair of the Stop the War Coalition in the UK. He served under Jeremy Corbyn from 2011 to 2015. He was one of the main organisers of the 15 February 2003 anti-war protest against the invasion of Iraq.

Early life
Christopher Mark Nineham was born in June 1962. His father was the Reverend Professor Dennis Nineham, the former warden of Keble College, University of Oxford. He was educated at Westminster School.

He briefly attended Clare College, Cambridge in 1981.

Activism
He was a leading member of Globalise Resistance, the anti-globalisation network that protested in Genoa and elsewhere and he played a role in the European and World Social Forums. He was a member of the Trotskyist Socialist Workers' Party for many years until he resigned in 2010.

Nineham is deputy leader of the Stop the War Coalition. He has written on the anti-war movement and the anti-capitalist movement as well as on the media, modernism and cultural theory, and is the author of The People Versus Tony Blair and Capitalism and Class Consciousness: the ideas of Georg Lukács.

Books

Selected articles
 "Raymond Williams" (Socialist Review, 1996)
 "Anticapitalism: An idea whose time has come" (Socialist Review, 2001)
 "Don't be nostalgic about Tony Blair" (The Guardian, 2014)

References

External links
 Counterfire
 Stop the War Coalition

1962 births
Living people
British anti–Iraq War activists
British Trotskyists
Socialist Workers Party (UK) members
People educated at Westminster School, London